Andrejs Cigaņiks (born 12 April 1997) is a Latvian professional footballer who plays as a left winger or wing-back for Polish club Widzew Łódź and the Latvia national team.

Club career
Born in Riga, Cigaņiks started playing football in the youth teams of Skonto FC, before signing for German club Bayer 04 Leverkusenin 2013. In June 2016 he was loaned to FC Viktoria Köln, before playing for FC Schalke 04 II. Cigaņiks transferred to Dutch club SC Cambuur in July 2018.

He returned to Latvia in 2019 and spent the second half of the season at Premier League club RFS. In January 2020, he signed a two-and-a-half year contract with Ukrainian Premier League club Zorya Luhansk. In July 2021 he signed for Slovakian club DAC Dunajská Streda. On 2 January 2023, Cigaņiks joined Polish Ekstraklasa side Widzew Łódź on a deal until June 2024, with an option to extend for another year.

On 2 January 2023, Cigaņiks joined Polish Ekstraklasa side Widzew Łódź on a deal until June 2024, with an option to extend for another year.

International career
After playing for the Latvian youth teams, he made his senior international debut for Latvia on 13 October 2018, appearing as a substitute in the 67th minute, against Kazakhstan in the UEFA Nations League match.  He scored his first goal for the national team on 1 September 2021 against Gibraltar in the 2022 FIFA World Cup qualifiers.

Career statistics

International

International goals
Scores and results list Latvia's goal tally first, score column indicates score after each Ciganiks goal.

Personal life
Cigaņiks's father is from Ukraine and is a cousin of Ukrainian sports journalist and commentator Ihor Tsyhanyk.

References

1997 births
Living people
Latvian people of Ukrainian descent
Latvian footballers
Latvia youth international footballers
Latvia under-21 international footballers
Latvia international footballers
Skonto FC players
Bayer 04 Leverkusen players
FC Viktoria Köln players
FC Schalke 04 II players
SC Cambuur players
FK RFS players
FC Zorya Luhansk players
FC DAC 1904 Dunajská Streda players
Widzew Łódź players
Regionalliga players
Eerste Divisie players
Latvian Higher League players
Ukrainian Premier League players
Slovak Super Liga players
Ekstraklasa players
Association football midfielders
Latvian expatriate footballers
Latvian expatriate sportspeople in Germany
Expatriate footballers in Germany
Latvian expatriate sportspeople in the Netherlands
Expatriate footballers in the Netherlands
Latvian expatriate sportspeople in Ukraine
Expatriate footballers in Ukraine
Latvian expatriate sportspeople in Slovakia
Expatriate footballers in Slovakia
Latvian expatriate sportspeople in Poland
Expatriate footballers in Poland